John Wemyss may refer to:
 John Wemyss (minister) (c. 1579–1636), Church of Scotland minister, Hebrew scholar and exegete
Sir John Wemyss (landowner) (1558–1621), Scottish landowner
 John Wemyss, 1st Earl of Wemyss (1586–1649), his son, Scottish politician
 John Wemyss of Logie (1569–1596), Scottish courtier and spy